The 1891 Birthday Honours were appointments by Queen Victoria to various orders and honours to reward and highlight good works by citizens of the British Empire. The appointments were made to celebrate the official birthday of The Queen, and were published in the London Gazette on 29 May 1891 and in The Times on 30 May 1891.

The recipients of honours are displayed here as they were styled before their new honour, and arranged by honour, with classes (Knight, Knight Grand Cross, etc.) and then divisions (Military, Civil, etc.) as appropriate.

United Kingdom and British Empire

Baron

Sir George Stephen 
Samuel Cunliffe-Lister.

Privy Councillor
The Queen appointed the following to Her Majesty's Most Honourable Privy Council:
Aretas Akers-Douglas 
The Hon. Evelyn Ashley.
William Lidderdale.

Baronetcies
The Right Hon. Peter O'Brien, Chief Justice of the High Court of Justice in Ireland.

Knight Bachelor
Henry Bennett, Mayor of Great Grimsby.
Archibald Geikie  Director-General of the Geological Survey of the United Kingdom.
Henry Reader Lack, Comptroller-General of the Patent Office.
Gustavus Nathan, her Majesty's Consul-General at Vienna.
Henry Oakley, General Manager Great Northern Railway.
Walter Sherburne Prideaux, Clerk to the Goldsmiths' Company.
William Charles Windeyer, Puisne Judge of the Supreme Court of New South Wales.
Walter Thomas Wragg, Puisne Judge of the Supreme Court of Natal.
Julian Emanuel Salomons  Member of the Legislative Council of New South Wales.
Robert Gillespie, of the Dominion of Canada.

The Most Honourable Order of the Bath

Knight Grand Cross of the Order of the Bath (KGCB)
Military Division
General Sir Samuel James Browne  Indian Staff Corps.
General Sir Charles Patton Keyes  Indian Staff Corps.
General Sir John Ross  Commanding the Troops in the Dominion of Canada.
Lt.-Gen. Sir John Chetham McLeod 
Lt.-Gen. Sir Henry Evelyn Wood  Commanding the Troops, Aldershot.

Knight Commander of the Order of the Bath (KCB)
Military Division
Admiral Sir Francis Leopold McClintock  
General William Templer Hughes  Indian Staff Corps.
General Charles Robert Cureton  Indian Staff Corps. 
General John Field  Bombay Infantry.
Vice-Admiral George Willes Watson   Commander-in-Chief, North America and West Indies.
Lt.-Gen. Charles Craufurd Fraser 
Lt.-Gen. Wilbraham Oates Lennox  Royal Engineers.
Lt.-Gen. William John Williams  Royal Artillery.
Major-General and Honorary Lt.-Gen. Henry Edwin Weare  
Maj.-Gen. and Honorary Lt.-Gen. Alexander Abercromby Nelson  
William Alexander Mackinnon , Director-General of the Army Medical Department
Lt.-Col. and Col. (temporary Maj.-Gen.) Henry James Alderson  Royal Artillery, Director of Artillery.

Companion of the Order of the Bath (CB)
Military Division
Maj.-Gen. Thomas Rose Nimmo, Indian Staff Corps.
Capt. Walter Stewart 
Col. (temporary Maj.-Gen.) Henry le Guay Geary, Commanding Royal Artillery, Southern District.
Lt.-Col. and Col. the Hon. George Patrick Hyde Villiers  Grenadier Guards.
Capt. Alan Brodrick Thomas 
Capt. Henry Coey Kane 
Lt.-Col. and Col. William Popham Dicken  Indian Staff Corps.
Lt.-Col. and Col. Swinton John Browne, Indian Staff Corps.
Lt.-Col. and Col. Francis William Boileau, Indian Staff Corps.
Lt.-Col. and Col. Robert Cecil Richard Clifford, Indian Staff Corps.
Lt.-Col. and Col. James Calder Stewart, Indian Staff Corps.
Lt.-Col. and Col. Francis William Collis, Indian Staff Corps.
Lt.-Col. and Col. Joseph Gabbett, Indian Staff Corps.
Lt.-Col. and Col. Thomas Fraser  Royal Engineers.
Col. James Alleyne, Assistant Adjutant-General, Aldershot.
Lt.-Col. and Col. John Frederick Maurice, Professor, Staff College.
Col. Henry Richard Abadie, Regimental District.
Chief Inspector of Machinery John Harold Heffernan 
Col. James Woodward Scott  Royal Marine Light Infantry.
Lt.-Col. and Col. Bindon Blood, Royal Engineers.
Lt.-Col. and Col. Arthur Godolphin Yeatman-Biggs, Royal Artillery.
Maj. and Brevet Col. Charles Holled Smith, the King's Royal Rifle Corps (Governor-General of the Red Sea Littoral and Commandant, Suakin).
Lt.-Col. and Col. Richard Westmacott  Indian Staff Corps.
Col. Arthur Singleton Wynne, Assistant Adjutant General, Curragh.
Lt.-Col. and Col. Frederick Meyer Wardrop, 12th Lancers.
Maj. and Col. John Hartley Sandwith, Royal Marine Light Infantry, Deputy Assistant Adjutant-General, Egypt.
Maj. and Col. Charles Coghlan Smyth, the Welsh Regiment.
Principal Veterinary Surgeon James Drummond Lambert, Veterinary Department.
Col. William Gustavus Nicholson, Military Secretary to the Commander-in-Chief in India.
Brigade Surgeon Robert Waters 
Lt.-Col. Arthur James Poole.
Honorary Lt.-Col. Edmund Grey Skinner, Assistant Commissary General of Ordnance, Ordnance Store Department.
Lt.-Col. Wodehouse Dillon Richardson, Army Service Corps, Deputy Assistant Adjutant-General, Egypt.

Civil Division
Lt.-Col. and Col. Robert Young Armstrong, Royal Engineers, Inspector of Submarine Defences.
Robert Giffen, Assistant Secretary, Board of Trade.
Honorary Col. William Macdonnell, Chief Paymaster, Army Pay Department.
Frederic Lacey Robinson, Commissioner of Inland Revenue.
Guy Douglas Arthur Fleetwood Wilson, War Office.

The Most Exalted Order of the Star of India

Knight Commander (KCSI)
Philip Perceval Hutchins  Madras Civil Service, Member of the Council of the Governor-General of India.

Companion (CSI)
Col. George Herbert Trevor, Madras Staff Corps, Agent to the Governor-General in Rajputana.

The Most Distinguished Order of Saint Michael and Saint George

Knight Commander of the Order of St Michael and St George (KCMG)
Richard Southey  formerly Colonial Secretary of the Colony of the Cape of Good Hope and Lieutenant-Governor of the Province of Griqualand West.
John Forrest  Premier and Treasurer of the Colony of Western Australia.
George William Robert Campbell  oil retirement from the office of Inspector-General of Police and Prisons of the Island of Ceylon.

Companion of the Order of St Michael and St George (CMG)
William Grey-Wilson, Governor and Commander-in-Chief of the Island of St. Helena.
Col. John Elliott  Inspector-General of Police of the Island of Barbados.
Thomas Dickson Foote, late President of the General Legislative Council of the Leeward Islands and of the Legislative Council of Antigua.
Frederick Mitchell Hodgson, Colonial Secretary of the Gold Coast Colony.
George Chardin Denton, Colonial Secretary of the Colony of Lagos.
Lt.-Col. Alexander Chalmers McKean, for services in Zululand.
Lt.-Col. David Wilson, Commanding the Rifle Volunteers in Trinidad, and Sub-intendant of Crown Lands of that Colony.
Charles Shortt Dicken, Secretary to the Agent-General in London for the Colony of Queensland.
Charles James Ward, for services in connection with the Jamaica Exhibition.
George Stiebel, for services in connection with the Jamaica Exhibition.

Honorary Companion
Dato Sri Amar d'Raja Abdul Rahman, Secretary to His Highness the Sultan of Johore

The Most Eminent Order of the Indian Empire

Knight Grand Commander (GCIE)
His Highness Mir Ali Murad Khan, Talpur of Khairpur.

Knight Commander (KCIE)
Charles Bradley Pritchard  Bombay Civil Service. Member of the Council of the Governor of Bombay.

Companion (CIE)
Nawub Ahsun Ullah, of Dacca.
John Prescott Hewett, Bengal Civil Service.
Raj Kanti Chunder Mukarji Bahadur, Diwan of Jaipur.
Dr. William Schlich 
Maharaja Mahendra Singh, of Bhadawar.
Capt. Francis Edward Younghusband, 1st (King's) Dragoon Guards.
Vincent Robinson.
Khan Bahadur Muncherji Kavasji Murzban.

Distinguished Service Order (DSO)
Chief Inspector of Machinery Henry Benbow 
Col. Elphinstone Waters Begbie, Madras Infantry, Assistant Adjutant-General, Madras.
Maj. and Col. Francis William Rhodes, 1st Dragoon, Military Secretary to Governor, Bombay.
Capt. and Brevet Lt.-Col. Ian Standish Monteith Hamilton, the Gordon Highlanders, Assistant Adjutant-General (for Musketry), Bengal.
Maj. and Brevet Lt.-Col. Ralph Arthur Penrhyn Clements, the South Wales Borderers.
Maj. and Brevet Lt.-Col. Henry Hamilton Settle, Royal Engineers (attached to Egyptian Army).
Honorary Lt.-Col. Frank Graham Wintle, Assistant Commissary-General of Ordnance, Ordnance Store Department.
Maj. and Brevet Lt.-Col. Harold Pemberton Leach, Royal Engineers.
Surgeon-Maj. James Sutherland Wilkins, Indian Medical Service.
Maj. Charles Comyn Egerton, Indian Staff Corps, Assistant Adjutant-General, Punjab Frontier Force.
Maj. Alfred Mansel, Royal Artillery.
Capt. William Richard Yielding, Indian Staff Corps.
Capt. John Robert Beech  20th Hussars (attached to Egyptian Army).

References

Birthday Honours
1891 awards
1891 in Australia
1891 in Canada
1891 in India
1891 in the United Kingdom